Uncinia is a genus of flowering plants in the family Cyperaceae, known as hook-sedges in Australia and as hook grasses or bastard grasses in New Zealand. The genus is characterised by the presence of a long hook formed by an extension of the rachilla, which is used to attach the fruit to passing animals (epizoochory), especially birds, and it is this feature which gives the genus its name, from the Latin uncinus, meaning a hook or barb.

Systematics
Uncinia is a "satellite genus" of the very large genus Carex, alongside other satellites such as Cymophyllus, Kobresia, Schoenoxiphium, Vesicarex. Uncinia seems to form a monophyletic group, with the most distinct species being U. kingii, a species which has sometimes been placed in the genus Carex. Similarly, Carex microglochin has sometimes been included in Uncinia, as U. microglochin.

Distribution
Uncinia has a Gondwanan distribution, with most species found Australia, New Zealand and South America, as far north as Mexico and Jamaica. Of the 50–60 species, 30 are endemic to New Zealand, 6 are endemic to the east coast of Australia, and 4 are endemic to the Juan Fernández Islands. Smaller numbers of species are also found in New Guinea, Borneo, the Philippines, Hawaii, Tristan da Cunha, Kerguelen, Île Amsterdam, Île Saint-Paul, and the Prince Edward Islands, although none are known from the mainland of Africa. This distribution suggests that the genus had an origin in Antarctica.

It contains the following species:

Uncinia affinis (C. B. Clarke) Hamlin – New Zealand
Uncinia andina G. A. Wheeler – Argentina
Uncinia angustifolia Hamlin – New Zealand
Uncinia araucana G. A. Wheeler – Chile
Uncinia aspericaulis G. A. Wheeler – Juan Fernández Islands
Uncinia astonii Hamlin – New Zealand
Uncinia aucklandica Hamlin – New Zealand
Uncinia austroamericana G. A. Wheeler – Tierra del Fuego
Uncinia banksii Boott – New Zealand
Uncinia bracteosa Phil. – Chile
Uncinia brevicaulis Thouars – Hawaii, South America, Falkland Islands, Tristan da Cunha, Juan Fernández Islands
Uncinia caespitosa Boott – New Zealand
Uncinia chilensis G. A. Wheeler – Chile
Uncinia clavata (Kük.) Hamlin  – New Zealand
Uncinia compacta R. Br. – Australia
Uncinia costata Kük. – Juan Fernández Islands
Uncinia dawsonii Hamlin – New Caledonia
Uncinia debilior F. Muell. – Lord Howe Island
Uncinia dikei Nelmes – Marion Island
Uncinia distans Col. ex Boott – New Zealand
Uncinia divaricata Boott – New Zealand
Uncinia douglasii Boott – Juan Fernández Islands
Uncinia drucei Hamlin – New Zealand
Uncinia ecuadorensis G. A. Wheeler & Goetgh. – Ecuador
Uncinia egmontiana Hamlin – New Zealand
Uncinia elegans (Kük.) Hamlin – New Zealand, Tasmania
Uncinia erinacea Pers. – South America
Uncinia ferruginea Boott – New Zealand
Uncinia filiformis Boott – New Zealand
Uncinia flaccida S. T. Blake – Victoria (Australia)
Uncinia fuscovaginata Kük. – New Zealand
Uncinia gracilenta Hamlin – New Zealand
Uncinia hamata (Sw.) Urb. – Neotropics
Uncinia hookeri Boott – New Zealand's subantarctic islands, Macquarie Island
Uncinia involuta Hamlin – New Zealand
Uncinia kingii R.Br. ex Boott – Chile
Uncinia koyamai Gómez-Laur. – Costa Rica
Uncinia lacustris G. A. Wheeler – Ecuador
Uncinia laxiflora Petrie – New Zealand
Uncinia lechleriana Steud. – Magellan Region
Uncinia leptostachya Raoul – New Zealand
Uncinia loliacea Phil. – Chile
Uncinia longifructus (Kük.) Petrie – New Zealand
Uncinia macloviformis G. A. Wheeler – Juan Fernández Islands
Uncinia macrophylla Steud. – Chile
Uncinia macrotricha Franch. – Patagonia
Uncinia meridensis Steyerm. – Venezuela
Uncinia multifaria Nees ex Boott – Chile
Uncinia multifolia Boeckeler – Colombia
Uncinia negeri Kük. – Chile
Uncinia nemoralis K. L. Wilson – Australia
Uncinia nervosa Boott – New Zealand, Tasmania
Uncinia obtusifolia Boott  – New Zealand
Uncinia ohwiana Koyama – New Guinea
Uncinia paludosa G. A. Wheeler & Goetgh. – Ecuador
Uncinia perplexa Boott – Surville Cliffs (New Zealand)
Uncinia phleoides (Cav.) Pers. – Juan Fernández Islands, South America
Uncinia purpurata Petrie – New Zealand
Uncinia rapaensis H. St. John – Tubuai
Uncinia rubra Boott – New Zealand
Uncinia rupestris Raoul – New Zealand
Uncinia scabra Boott – New Zealand
Uncinia scabriuscula G. A. Wheeler – Argentina, Chile
Uncinia sclerophylla Nelmes – New Guinea
Uncinia silvestris Hamlin – New Zealand
Uncinia sinclairii Boott – New Zealand
Uncinia smithii Phil. – South Georgia, Falkland Islands
Uncinia strictissima Petrie – New Zealand
Uncinia subsacculata G. A. Wheeler & Goetgh. – Ecuador
Uncinia subtrigona Nelmes – Borneo, New Guinea
Uncinia sulcata K. L. Wilson – Australia
Uncinia tenella R. Br. – Australia
Uncinia tenuifolia G. A. Wheeler & Goetgh. – Ecuador
Uncinia tenuis Poeppig ex Kunth – Juan Fernández Islands, South America
Uncinia uncinata (L. f.) Kük. – New Zealand, Hawaii
Uncinia viridis (C. B. Clarke) Edgar – New Zealand
Uncinia zotovii Hamlin – New Zealand

References

 
Cyperaceae genera
Taxonomy articles created by Polbot